Polyptychus carteri is a moth of the family Sphingidae. It is known from lowland forests from Sierra Leone to the Congo and Uganda.

References

Polyptychus
Moths described in 1852
Moths of Africa